A referendum on increasing the number of members of the Landtag from 15 to 21 was held in Liechtenstein on 18 March 1945. The proposal was rejected by 79.2% of voters.

Results

References

1945 referendums
1945 in Liechtenstein
Referendums in Liechtenstein
March 1945 events in Europe